Kateřina Došková is a Czech former football striker who played for most of her career for Sparta Prague in the Czech 1st Division and the Champions League.

She was a member of the Czech national team for over a decade.

Došková was voted Czech Footballer of the Year (women) at the 2002.

References

1982 births
Living people
Czech women's footballers
Czech Republic women's international footballers
Sportspeople from Karlovy Vary
Women's association football forwards
AC Sparta Praha (women) players
Czech Women's First League players